PPI Motorsports was a race team which competed in CART, NASCAR and various off-road racing circuits.  The team had one of the few remaining single car operations in NASCAR.

Early years
PPI stood for Precision Preparation, Inc., a company founded by team owner Cal Wells in 1979.  The company provided parts for off-road racing teams.  Over time, PPI eventually began its own off-road team, with help with Toyota Motorsports.  PPI fielded off-road trucks for Mickey Thompson's SCORE series and then later fielded trucks which competed in outdoor events such as the Baja 1000.  Notable drivers for PPI include Ivan "Ironman" Stewart and a young Robby Gordon (who also drove in CART for the team in 1998).

CART years

PPI's relationship with Toyota expanded into the open-wheel ranks in 1995, when Wells formed a CART team with good friend Frank Arciero.  Their initial driver was Hiro Matsushita.  Known as Arciero-Wells, the CART team lasted for 5 years but only a managed a best finish of 4th in 1999 with rookie Cristiano da Matta.  In 1996, they began the CART season with Jeff Krosnoff driving, but he died in a tragic accident during the Toronto street race.  All PPI cars subsequently carried a decal commemorating Krosnoff's memory.  

After Arciero left in 2000, the team was rebranded as PPI Motorsports, and da Matta gave the team its first (and only) career victory in CART.  During this time, the team also ran a program in the Toyota Atlantic series, and had success in 2000 with rookie of the year Dan Wheldon.  Following the 2000 season, however, PPI shut down its open-wheel and off-road programs, ended its relationship with Toyota, and shifted its focus exclusively on NASCAR.

PPI also competed in Toyota Atlantic from 1998-2000, winning races with Anthony Lazzaro, Andrew Bordin, and Dan Wheldon. Lazzaro won the championship for the team in 1999.

NASCAR years
PPI Motorsports was notable in being the first NASCAR team to require pit crew members to wear helmets before the series mandated wearing helmets starting with the 2002 season.

Car No. 32 history 

PPI Motorsports started its first Cup team during the 2000 season with open-wheel and Trans Am standout Scott Pruett behind the wheel of the No.32 Tide-sponsored Ford.  The team was hardly a success in its first year, finishing in 37th place and failing to qualify for six races. Pruett was released at the end of the season and returned to Trans-Am.

With the team focusing exclusively on NASCAR in 2001, PPI fielded a two-car Winston Cup effort, with Ricky Craven taking over in the 32. Craven had a number of strong races, which he capped giving the team its first career victory at Martinsville in October. He finished 21st in the points standings that year.

Craven ran strong in 2002 and, although he failed to win a race for the team, he managed to improve his point championship standing and finishing 15th overall. This was the team's last season in a Ford, as they switched to Pontiac the next season.

Craven started 2003 the same way, with a strong Top 5 at Rockingham and a famous victory at Darlington, in which he beat Kurt Busch to the finish by just 0.002 seconds, which still stands today as the smallest margin of victory in NASCAR Cup Series history. It also turned out to be Pontiac's last win in the Winston Cup Series. However, a series of DNF's dropped Craven to 27th in points.

PPI showed clear signs of struggling in 2004 as Craven was unable to give the team a single Top 10 finish through the first 24 races. Wells and Craven parted ways due to lack of results and Busch Series driver Bobby Hamilton Jr. took Craven's place. Hamilton Jr. drove the car for the entire 2005 season. However, he failed to score a Top 10 during the year, and eventually finished 36th.  Wells did have some success after replacing Hamilton with road course ringer Ron Fellows at Infineon, with Fellows giving the team an eighth-place finish. Hamilton was replaced by Travis Kvapil, who drove the car for the 2006 season, only to have five DNQ's. Ron Fellows competed in the two road course races at Sonoma and Watkins Glen. After originally finishing 10th at the Glen, Fellows was penalised for skipping a portion of the track and dropped to 32nd.

At the end of the 2006 season, Tide left NASCAR as a full-time sponsor. Unable to find a new sponsor, Wells shut down the team before the 2007 season and sold his owner points to Michael Waltrip Racing.

Car No. 96 history 

Later in 2000, PPI started a second Cup Series team with backing from Ronald McDonald House Charities. Truck Series driver Andy Houston was to drive the #96 Ford for five races toward the end of the 2000 season, with the intent being for the team to run the full 2001 schedule. 

Houston finished no better than 26th in his five starts, but the team still entered the 2001 season having picked up sponsorship from McDonald’s, which had been sponsoring Bill Elliott for the previous several years in his owner-driver venture.

The #96 struggled to find its footing. After qualifying ninth for the Daytona 500, Houston fell two laps down before being collected in a massive wreck on lap 175. He then failed to qualify for the next two races at Rockingham and Las Vegas. 

Houston would record his best finish at Martinsville in April, where he finished 17th and was the last car running on the lead lap. Two races later he recorded his second top twenty finish, a 19th place run at California Speedway. 

After that, Houston’s performance declined significantly. He failed to qualify for the races at Michigan, Pocono, and Sears Point in June, and the #96 was entered in neither the July New Hampshire or Pocono races nor the road course event at Watkins Glen. Houston also missed the Southern 500 at Darlington, having failed to qualify for either event there, and the fall race at Richmond. 

In the races he did manage to qualify for, Houston also struggled to perform. Although he qualified well again at Daytona in July, he was again collected in a crash. He qualified in the top 15 at both Chicagoland and Indianapolis, but Houston’s engine blew three laps into the former event and he crashed on the opening lap in the latter. In all three of these races, Houston finished 43rd and last. In fact, after his top 20 run at California, Houston finished 40th or worse seven times. 

McDonald's eventually cooled to the idea of continuing to sponsor Houston because of his poor performances and during the week leading up to the race at Indianapolis, they announced that they would be dropping their full-time sponsorship of the #96 after the inaugural race at Kansas in the fall. Houston finished eighteenth in that race, failing to finish on the lead lap. He was released following the event as no sponsor signed on to replace McDonald's, resulting in the team being shut down.

Driver history

CART
  Hiro Matsushita (1995, 1997–1998)
  Jeff Krosnoff (1996)
  Max Papis (1996–1998)
  Robby Gordon (1998)
  Cristiano da Matta (1999–2000)
  Scott Pruett (1999)
  Oriol Servia (2000)

NASCAR
  Scott Pruett (2000)
  Andy Houston (2000–2001)
  Ricky Craven (2001–2004)
  Bobby Hamilton Jr. (2004–2005)
  Ron Fellows (2005–2006; road courses only)
  Travis Kvapil (2006)

(key)

 Jeff Krosnoff died in an accident at the Molson Indy Toronto.
 Oriol Servià was penalized 4 points for rough driving in Surfers Paradise.
 The Firestone Firehawk 600 was canceled after qualifying due to excessive g-forces on the drivers.

IndyCar win

Complete NASCAR Results

No. 32 Car

No. 96 Car

External links

 PPI Racing stats at racing-reference.info
 PPI Motorsports shuts down

American auto racing teams
Champ Car teams
Defunct NASCAR teams
Auto racing teams disestablished in 2006
Auto racing teams established in 1979
Atlantic Championship teams